Rosemary Hennessy (2 March 1950) is an American academic and socialist feminist. She is a Professor of English and Director of the Center for the Study of Women, Gender, and Sexuality at Rice University. She has been a part of the faculty at Rice since 2006.

She has written extensively on materialist feminism.

Education 
She received her Ph.D in English from Syracuse University, her M.A. in English from Temple University, and her B.A. in English from the University of Pennsylvania.

Selected bibliography

Books

Book chapters

Journal articles

See also 
 Material feminism
 Double burden
 Economic materialism
 Feminist economics
 Monique Wittig
 Christine Delphy

References

Further reading

External links 
 Center for the Study of Women, Gender, and Sexuality, Rosemary Hennessy's biography. 

1950 births
Feminism and social class
Feminism and the family
Marxist feminism
Rice University faculty
American socialist feminists
Syracuse University alumni
Temple University alumni
University of Pennsylvania alumni
Living people
Materialist feminists